"Foreign" is a song by American singer Trey Songz, released on May 13, 2014. The song serves as the third single from his sixth studio album, Trigga which was released on July 1, 2014. American record producers Soundz and "The Insomniaks" co-produced the track.

Remix
The official remix is part of the standard track list and features Canadian artist Justin Bieber.

Charts

Weekly charts

Year-end charts

References

2014 singles
Trey Songz songs
2014 songs
Atlantic Records singles
Songs written by Soundz
Songs written by Trey Songz